Lee Irby (born 1963) is an American novelist and historian.

He is   the author of  three major novels. The first, 7,000 Clams (as of 2010,  in 596  libraries according to WorldCat),  and was reviewed in The North American Review    and  many newspapers.     His later work,  The Up and Up  (as of 2010,  in 406  libraries according to WorldCat), and was     reviewed even more widely.    Both were published by Doubleday. Irby's work centers on the quirks of Florida's history, the interplay of natural beauty and rampant corruption and violence that marked the Sunshine State in the 1920s. In early 2012, he released "The Van", a novel following the life of a VW Bus. He taught at Eckerd College, a private liberal arts school located in St. Petersburg, Florida.

Irby was born in Richmond, Virginia, in 1963. He graduated from the University of Virginia in 1986 with degrees in English and History. He then set about seeing the world, living in St. Croix, Italy, Mexico, and several major U.S. cities. He came of age in Key West, Florida, where he worked many odd jobs but found his voice as a writer amid the human debris of that island city.

References

1963 births
Living people
21st-century American novelists
American male novelists
21st-century American historians
21st-century American male writers
21st-century American non-fiction writers
American male non-fiction writers